Conrad Purser (born 2 August 1931) is an Australian former association football player.

Playing career
Purser played his club football for North Perth in the Western Australian state league where he played 13 seasons, five as captain.

He played twice for Australia, once in a full international match against South Africa and once against Hungarian club team Ferencváros.

Con was the first West Australian to be selected for an Olympics Football squad, making the 1956 Melbourne team. He represented WA 18 times being captain on 9 occasions. He was also State player/coach in 1957–58. He was inducted into the Hall of Champions in 1996 and included in the Century of Champions

References

1931 births
Australian soccer players
Australia international soccer players
People from Collie, Western Australia
Living people
Footballers at the 1956 Summer Olympics
Olympic soccer players of Australia
Association football defenders